Depressaria velox is a moth of the family Depressariidae. It is found in Spain, France, Ukraine and Greece.

The wingspan is 20–25 mm.

The larvae feed on Ferula species.

References

External links
lepiforum.de

Moths described in 1859
Depressaria
Moths of Europe